The Western Norway Research Institute (WRNI, Vestlandsforsking in Norwegian), is an assignment based research foundation founded by the county municipality of Sogn og Fjordane. Located in the Fosshaugane Campus, of the Sogn og Fjordane University College in Sogndal, the Institute is independent of the University and conducts research and development studies commissioned by research councils, industry and, the public sector. Though international in nature the institute maintains strong regional ties particularly in the fields of climate adaptation and rural tourism. Its special areas of expertise include; information communication, technology systems, organizational research, environmental research, sustainable tourism, environmental policy and energy production and use and, climate change social impacts, evaluation and adaptation.

Research areas

Environment
 
In accordance with Agenda 21 guidelines, the institute takes the concept of sustainable development as the starting point in its environmental research programmes. Main thematic areas covered are: local environment and climate policy, industrial ecology, sustainable mobility, alternative fuels, and sustainable agriculture.

Innovation

Within this interdisciplinary field the institute is focused on the following: 
eGovernment and public sector organisation; Regional development; Infrastructure and networking; eCommerce in small and medium-sized businesses.

Tourism

Within this department the focus is on sustainable tourism, IT and tourism, and leisure-time consumption.

Usability

The institutes work in the field of Usability largely focuses on human computer interfaces (HCI), information architecture and semantic web. Most of the projects are user-oriented and include the following:

 Analysis of IT systems (mostly web sites and web applications) with the help of indicator systems
 Developing requirements specifications for web sites and web applications
 Developing controlled vocabularies for better semantic support in web portals
 Analysis and development of search systems, taxonomies and ontologies (through semantic technologies like topic maps)

Climate change adaptation
The Institute has been engaged in climate specific adaptation projects at a regional level through its involvement with NORADAPT - Community Adaptation and Vulnerability in Norway. Focus has been on how projected changes in climate interact with changes in socio-economic and institutional conditions, and how these interactions shape vulnerability and adaptation at the local level in Norway. This has led to a series of climate adaptation strategies being developed by municipalities such as Fredrikstad and Flora  with the support of the Institute. The Institute is currently engaged in identifying the conditions that facilitate or constrain the adaptive capacity of municipalities to climate change with particular emphasis being placed on the interaction of climate and socioeconomic changes. This expertise led to the Institute's involvement with the Northern Periphery Programme (NPP), Clim-ATIC, where it was activity co-ordinator, providing guidance and expertise on local climate change impacts and the combining of climate and socio-economic scenarios 
.

International projects
The Institute is engaged in a range of national and international projects and organisations such as POSC Caesar Association POSC Caesar (PCA) an international, open, not-for-profit, member organization that promotes the interoperability of data, software and related matters.

Selected publications

Climate adaptation 

 Historical records of natural hazards events as guidance for preventive spatial planning
 Local climate change adaptation: missing link, Black Jack or blind alley?
 Integrating climate change adaptation into civil protection: comparative lessons from Norway, Sweden and the Netherlands
 Implementing adaptation to climate change at the local level
 Klimatilpassing i Sogn og Fjordane anno 2008
 Klimaproblemet og bankenes tilpasning
 Exit War, Enter Climate? Institutional change and the introduction of climate adaptation in Norways public system of civil protection
 Report from the CIVILCLIM study tour to Sweden and the Netherlands, October 2008
 Naturskade i kommunene - Sluttrapport fra prosjekt for KS
 Regional klimasårbarheitsanalyse for Nord-Norge.
 Indicators for Local-Scale Climate Vulnerability Assessments

References

External links 
 Homepage

Research institutes in Norway